Hyperhomocysteinemia is a medical condition characterized by an abnormally high level of homocysteine in the blood, conventionally described as above 15 μmol/L.

As a consequence of the biochemical reactions in which homocysteine is involved, deficiencies of
vitamin B6, folic acid (vitamin B9), and vitamin B12 can lead to high homocysteine levels. Other possible causes of hyperhomocysteinemia include genetics, excessive methionine intake, and other diseases. 

Hyperhomocysteinemia is typically managed with vitamin B6, vitamin B9 and vitamin B12 supplementation. Hyperhomocysteinemia is a risk factor for cardiovascular disease; however, supplements of these vitamins may not improve cardiovascular disease outcomes.

Signs and symptoms 
Elevated levels of homocysteine have been associated with a number of disease states.

Cardiovascular risks 
Elevated homocysteine is a known risk factor for cardiovascular disease as well as thrombosis. It has also been shown to be associated with microalbuminuria which is a strong indicator of the risk of future cardiovascular disease and renal dysfunction. Homocysteine degrades and inhibits the formation of the three main structural components of arteries: collagen, elastin and proteoglycans. In proteins, homocysteine permanently degrades cysteine disulfide bridges and lysine amino acid residues, affecting structure and function.

Neuropsychiatric illness 
Evidence exists linking elevated homocysteine levels with vascular dementia and Alzheimer's disease. There is also evidence that elevated homocysteine levels and low levels of vitamin B6 and B12 are risk factors for mild cognitive impairment and dementia. Oxidative stress induced by homocysteine may also play a role in schizophrenia.

Bone health 
Elevated levels of homocysteine have also been linked to increased fractures in elderly persons. Homocysteine auto-oxidizes and reacts with reactive oxygen intermediates, damaging endothelial cells and increasing the risk of thrombus formation.

Ectopia lentis 
Homocystinuria is the second most common cause of heritable ectopia lentis. Homocystinuria is an autosomal recessive metabolic disorder most often caused by a near absence of cystathionine b-synthetase. It is associated with intellectual disability, osteoporosis, chest deformities, and increased risk of thrombotic episodes. Lens dislocation occurs in 90% of patients, and is thought to be due to decreased zonular integrity due to the enzymatic defect. Lens dislocation in homocystinuria is usually bilateral and in 60% of cases occurs in the inferior or nasal direction.

Causes

Vitamin deficiency 
Deficiencies of vitamins B6, B9 and B12 can lead to high homocysteine levels. Vitamin B12 acts as a cofactor for the enzyme methionine synthase (which forms part of the S-adenosylmethionine (SAM) biosynthesis and regeneration cycle). Vitamin B12 deficiency prevents the 5-methyltetrahydrofolate (5-MTHF) form of folate from being converted into THF due to the "methyl trap". This disrupts the folate pathway and leads to an increase in homocysteine which damages cells (for example, damage to endothelial cells can result in increased risk of thrombosis).

Alcohol 
Chronic consumption of alcohol may also result in increased plasma levels of homocysteine.

Tobacco 
Smokeless tobacco is implicated as risk factor for hyperhomocysteinemia. Smoking also causes hyperhomocysteinemia

Genetic 
Homocysteine is a non-protein amino acid, synthesized from methionine and either recycled back into methionine or converted into cysteine with the aid of the B-group vitamins.
 About 50% of homocysteine  is converted back to methionine by remethylation via the methionine synthase major pathway.  This requires active folate and vitamin B12, in order to donate a methyl group. Active folate is known as 5-methyltetrahydrofolate (5-MTHF).
 Another pathway for the conversion of homocysteine back to methionine also exists, involving methylation with trimethylglycine (also called betaine or abbreviated to TMG) as a methyl donor.
 The remaining homocysteine is transsulfurated to cysteine, with vitamin B6 as the co-factor.

Genetic defects in 5-MTHF reductase can consequently lead to hyperhomocysteinemia. The most common polymorphisms are known as MTHFR C677T and MTR A2756G. These polymorphisms occur in about 10% of the world's population. Elevations of homocysteine can also occur in the rare hereditary disease homocystinuria.

Diagnosis 
A blood test can be performed to quantify total homocysteine concentration in the plasma, of which approximately 80% is generally protein-bound. Classification of hyperhomocysteinemia is defined with respect to serum concentration as follows:
 Moderate: 15–30 nmol/mL (or μmol/L)
 Intermediate: 30–100 nmol/mL
 Severe: > 100 nmol/mL
If total homocysteine concentration is not found to be elevated, but clinical suspicion is still high, an oral methionine loading challenge several hours prior to quantification of homocysteine concentration may be used to increased sensitivity for marginal abnormalities of homocysteine metabolism.

Fasting for 10 hours is sometimes recommended prior to measurement of homocysteine levels, but this may not be necessary for diagnostic yield.

Treatment 
Vitamins B6, B9, or B12 supplements (alone or combined), while they lower homocysteine level, do not change the risk of heart disease or prevent death in people who have heart disease when compared to standard care or to an inactive supplement in a clinical trial. When combined with medicine to reduce blood pressure (antihypertensive drugs), it is not clear if treatments that lower homocysteine can help prevent a stroke in some people. Hypotheses have been offered to address the failure of homocysteine-lowering therapies to reduce cardiovascular events. When folic acid is given as a supplement, it may increase the build-up of arterial plaque. A second hypothesis involves the methylation of genes in vascular cells by folic acid and vitamin B12, which may also accelerate plaque growth. Finally, altered methylation may catalyse l-arginine to asymmetric dimethylarginine, which is known to increase the risk of vascular disease.

See also 
 Homocystinuria
 Kilmer S. McCully

References

External links 

Amino acid metabolism disorders